An Ironman 70.3, also known as a Half Ironman, is one of a series of long-distance triathlon races organized by the World Triathlon Corporation (WTC). The "70.3" refers to the total distance in miles (113.0 km) covered in the race, consisting of a  swim, a  bike ride, and a  run. Each distance of the swim, bike, and run segments is half the distance of that segment in an Ironman Triathlon. The Ironman 70.3 series culminates each year with a World Championship competition, for which competitors qualify during the 70.3 series in the 12 months prior to the championship race. In addition to the World Championship race, Ironman 70.3 championship competitions are also held for the European, Asia-Pacific, and Latin America regions.

The time needed by an athlete to complete a 70.3 distance event varies from race to race and can be influenced by external factors. These factors include the terrain and the total elevation gained and lost on the course, weather conditions, and course conditions. Finish times range from sub-four-hour completion times by elite level athletes to the imposed race cut off, which is commonly 8 hours and 30 minutes after the start time.

Ironman 70.3 World Championship
Qualification into the Ironman 70.3 World Championship can be obtained through the Ironman 70.3 series of events held during the 12-month qualification period prior to the championship. Some Ironman 70.3 events also act as qualifiers for the full Ironman World Championship in Hawaii, USA. Professional triathletes qualify for the championship race by competing in races during the qualifying period, earning points towards their pro rankings. An athlete's five highest-scoring races are counted toward their pro rankings. The top 50 males and top 35 females in the pro rankings qualify for the championship race.

Amateur triathletes can qualify for the championship race by earning a qualifying slot at one of the qualifying events. At qualifying events, slots are allocated to each age group category, male and female, with the number of slots given out based on that category's proportional representation of the overall field. Each age group category is tentatively allocated one qualifying spot in each qualifying event.

From its first year as a championship race series in 2006 until 2010, the Ironman 70.3 World Championships were held in Clearwater, Florida, USA during the month of November. In 2011, the 70.3 Championship venue changed to Las Vegas along with date of the event moved up in the calendar to September. Lake Las Vegas is the site of the event's swim. For 2014 and all following years the location for the 70.3 Championship will change each year.

Men's championship

6: 
3: 
3: 
2: 
1: 
1:

Women's championship

5: 
5: 
3: 
1: 
2:

Location

History
The first Half Ironman branded race was Half Ironman UK, which was raced in 2001. However, prior to the launch of the 70.3 series in 2005, races were then known as Half Ironman before adopting the Ironman 70.3 label. The oldest half-iron-distance race, though not under the WTC umbrella at the time, is the Superfrog Triathlon, which began in 1979.

The number of qualification events within the 70.3 series has grown since its inception, growing to match the popularity of the sport and interest in the distance. Since the first year of the Ironman 70.3 Championship race in 2006 the series grew from 14 events to over 60 events in the span of seven years. The 2016 series saw 89 events worldwide, with the biggest one-year increase in the number of events coming between the 2011 and 2012 series when the number of races grew from 38 to 57.

World records

Due to the lack of course certification for half-iron distance races, there is no official world record for 70.3 events. The fastest times to complete a half-iron distance race for men and women were both set at the 2019 Ironman 70.3 Bahrain by Kristian Blummenfelt and Holly Lawrence. While these still remain the fastest times for any Ironman-branded 70.3 race, they were achieved on a 53.9-mile (86.8 km) bike course, noticeably less than the standard 56-mile (90 km) course for 70.3 events.

Ironman 70.3 records

Half-iron distance records

References

External links
World Triathlon Corporation Ironman 70.3 webpages

70.3
Recurring sporting events established in 2006
2006 establishments in Florida
Half marathons